Turkic American can refer to, among others:

 Turkish Americans
 Azerbaijani Americans
 Kazakh Americans
 Uzbek Americans